Rui Filipe Pereira Faria (born 30 May 1992) is a Portuguese footballer who plays for Länk FC Vilaverdense, as a midfielder.

Football career
On 23 July 2017, Faria made his professional debut with Gil Vicente in a 2017–18 Taça da Liga match against Varzim.

References

External links

1992 births
People from Barcelos, Portugal
Living people
Portuguese footballers
Association football midfielders
Gil Vicente F.C. players
SC Vianense players
C.D. Trofense players
S.C. Salgueiros players
A.D. Sanjoanense players
Campeonato de Portugal (league) players
Liga Portugal 2 players
Sportspeople from Braga District